VF Venture is a part of the Danish state investment fund, The Danish Growth Fund. VF Venture is The Danish Growth Fund's department for direct equity investments on market conditions in innovative Danish companies with ambitions of expanding beyond the Danish borders. VF Venture invests in different industries, especially with focus on IT, biomedical engineering, cleantech, and industrial technology. VF Venture's investments range form DKK 5-25 million. The current portfolio holds approximately 35 companies. VF Venture make 5-10 new investments each year.

External links 
 About VF Venture

References 

Economy of Denmark
Foreign direct investment
Sovereign wealth funds